The women's 4 × 400 metres relay at the 2015 World Championships in Athletics was held at the Beijing National Stadium on 29 and 30 August.

Summary
The Jamaican team announced their intention to win this race early in the championships by placing all four of their relay team members in the top six of the final of the 400 metres.  The American squad had two women in that same race, one of them the winner Allyson Felix.  Their ace in the hole was having the top two in the world, prior to the American championships, fail to make the individual event but were available for the relay.  Both Olympic Champion Sanya Richards-Ross and World Indoor Champion Francena McCorory demonstrated their occasional ability to run excellent 350 meter races in that meet, their flailing last 50 metres is why they didn't qualify for the individual race.  All the other teams ran their season best just to make the finals, Bahamas and Japan set National Records and still failed to qualify.

In the final, it was a reminder of 2008 on this same track as Richards-Ross was out aggressively, making up the stagger on Christine Ohuruogu and when she hit the home stretch, she was out of gas.  Meanwhile, to their outside, Christine Day was running smoothly to give Jamaica a big lead, Shericka Jackson.  Natasha Hastings ran a quick turn to barely hold off Anyika Onuora at the break.  Jackson started her leg conservatively, so the gap looked manageable, until she started cranking and the lead gap started growing.  Jamaica had an almost two second lead when Jackson handed off to Stephenie Ann McPherson, Hastings helped the USA hold off the British team before handing off to the American's star, Felix.  The gap looked impossible at the beginning but Felix closed it down.  It took Felix 350 metres to catch McPherson, but it was a steady race throughout and when Felix got there she just continued on by, handing off to world #3 Francena McCorory with the lead.  Jamaica had Novlene Williams-Mills on the anchor leg, starting 2 metres down.  Down the backstretch and into the final turn, McCorory held the same gap on Williams-Mills, then through the turn the gap started to widen.  Onto the home stretch, Williams-Mills moved out to lane 2 to look for running room.  70 metres before the finish, McCorory's arm movement got bigger but her legs got noticeably slower.  Williams-Mills cruised on by a helpless McCorory with powerful sprint form across the line for gold.  Well behind the leaders, the British team was challenged by Nigeria until Patience Okon George met with a similar collapse.  While Seren Bundy-Davies carried the British home for bronze, George was overtaken at the line by Russia's Kseniya Aksyonova.	

Felix's remarkable leg was timed at 47.72, the fastest of her already brilliant history in that category and the third fastest women's relay leg ever measured, just .02 off the fastest measured electronically.

Records
Prior to the competition, the records were as follows:

Qualification standards

Schedule

Results

Heats
Qualification: First 2 of each heat (Q) plus the 2 fastest times (q) advance to the final.

Final
The final was held at 20:05

References

4 x 400 metres relay
Relays at the World Athletics Championships
2015 in women's athletics